Michael Ninian Harbour (4 July 1945 – 9 April 2009) was a British actor.

In a career spanning forty years from 1969 until his death, he took on roles in television programmes such as The Line of Beauty, Heartbeat, Casualty, Doctors, Dixon of Dock Green, Midsomer Murders and Love Lies Bleeding. Harbour also lent his voice to the character of Edgar Barker in the UFO: Afterlight computer game.

In 1998, he played the Mysterious Man/Cinderella's Father in Into the Woods at the Donmar Warehouse. He also played Firmin in the West End production of The Phantom of the Opera.

His daughter is the English voice actress Kate Harbour.

Harbour died on 9 April 2009 at home with his family.

Filmography

External links
 
 Obituary in The Guardian

1945 births
2009 deaths
English male stage actors
English male television actors